Ormeño is a Spanish surname. Notable people with the surname include:
Alonso de Olmedo y Ormeño (1626–1682), Spanish actor, playwright and writer
Álvaro Ormeño (born 1979), Chilean footballer
Bruno Ormeno (born 1982), French rugby league player
Bryan Ormeño (born 1993), Chilean footballer
Filomeno Ormeño Belmonte (1899–1975), Peruvian composer, orchestrator and pianist
Jorge Ormeño (born 1977), Chilean footballer
María de la Luz Jiménez Ormeño (born 1934), Chilean actress, theater director and teacher
Raúl Ormeño (born 1958), Chilean footballer
Santiago Ormeño (born 1994), Mexican-Peruvian footballer, grandson of Walter
Walter Ormeño (1926–2020), Peruvian footballer
Walter Ormeño de Cañete, a football club named after him

Spanish-language surnames